In 2012, a study by the Federation of Zoroastrian Associations of North America published a demographic picture of Zoroastrianism around the world, which was compared with an earlier study from 2004. It projected a global Zoroastrian population of 111,691–121,962 people, with roughly half of this figure residing in just two countries: India and Iran. These numbers indicated a notable population decline in comparison with the earlier projection of 124,953 people.

, estimates show that there are some 100,000–200,000 Zoroastrians worldwide. The larger part of the population comprises Parsis, a community standing at around 70,000 people in India and around 1,000 in Pakistan. There is an estimated 4,000 Parsis in the United Kingdom. In 1994, the Zoroastrian Society of Ontario estimated that there were around 100–200 Zoroastrians residing in Afghanistan.

In 2015, the Kurdistan Region of Iraq (KRI) granted official recognition to the Zoroastrian religion and also proceeded with the opening of three new Zoroastrian temples. The KRI's Zoroastrian community has claimed that thousands of people residing in the autonomous territory have recently converted from Islam to Zoroastrianism. In 2020, a KRI-based Zoroastrian advocacy group known as the Yasna Association, which also functions as a representative of the faith within the KRI's government, claimed that about 15,000 people had been registered with the organization . Additionally, the Group for Analyzing and Measuring Attitudes in Iran (GAMAAN) conducted an online survey in 2020 to record the religious attitudes of Iranians, and approximately 7.7 percent of respondents identified as Zoroastrian.

See also 
Iranian religions
Zoroastrianism
Muslim conquest of Persia
Persecution of Zoroastrians

References 

Countries By Zoroastrian Population
Zoroastrian